Tropidophorus hangnam  is a species of skink found in Thailand.

References

hangnam
Reptiles of Thailand
Reptiles described in 2005